Quest for the Mighty Sword (also known as Ator III: The Hobgoblin, The Hobgoblin, or Troll 3) is a 1990 Italian fantasy adventure film directed by Joe D'Amato. It is the fourth and final film in the Ator film series.

Plot 
Once upon a time, a god gave a mighty sword to the king of Aquiles to bring justice to his people. Now he wants it back – but the king gives his life rather than give up the sword. Goddess Dehamira, who spoke for him, is stripped of all her privileges and held in a circle of fire until a human arrives who's strong enough to free her. When prince Ator becomes 18, he gets the sword from the mean sorcerer gnome Grindl to free Dehamira and his people. On his journey, he has to fight against dragons and other fantastic figures.

Cast
 Eric Allan Kramer as The Son of Ator (as Eric Allen Kramer)
 Margaret Lenzey as Dehamira / DeJanira
 Dina Morrone as Sunn
 Marisa Mell as Nephele
 Laura Gemser as Grimilde
 Donald O'Brien as Gunther (as Donal O'Brien)
 Chris Murphy as Skiold
 Don Semeraro as Thorn-Grindel Hagen

Production
Actress Marisa Mell returned to the screen in this film after a five years absence. The film re-used some of the goblin masks from Troll 2.

The film bears more than passing similarities to the German mythical Nibelung Saga, more specifically the Wagner operas made from the myth. Ator is the equivalent of Siegfried, raised and abused by Grindl (Mime), who gets the magic sword (Notung), and frees the sleeping warrior maiden Dehamira (Brünhilde) from a circle of fire. The last act of the film with the evil king and his pet gnome/troll is similar to Twilight of the Gods, with the characters Gunther and Hagen even retaining their names from the opera, as well as Gunther's sister Grimhilde - though unlike the opera, Quest for the Mighty Sword does not end with Ator's death.

Release
In the United States, Quest for the Mighty Sword was released direct-to-video on August 29, 1990.

The film was also released as Ator III: The Hobgoblin, The Hobgoblin, and in Germany as Troll 3 (German release title). D'Amato personally referred to the film as The Lord of Akili in a 1996 interview.

Reception
John Stanley called the film "[a]nother pathetic entry in the Italian-produced Ator series". Keith Bailey gave it a rating of one out of five stars, categorising it as "so bad it's good", with reservations due to some "dull moments". He wrote that the film's hero "manages to avoid spaghetti sauce lava when not fighting Siamese-twin robots and mucus-covered Godzilla clones in a quest that really doesn't seem to have any specific goal" and thus grants that "there are some hilariously bad sequences that will please fans of the abysmal".

References

Footnotes

Sources

External links
 
 
 

1990 films
1990 fantasy films
Ator
English-language Italian films
Films directed by Joe D'Amato
Films scored by Carlo Maria Cordio
Sword and sorcery films
Alternative sequel films
Fantasy crossover films